Epacris cerasicollina is a species of flowering plant in the heath family Ericaceae and is endemic to Tasmania. It is a shrub with lance-shaped to egg-shaped, slightly concave leaves and tube-shaped white flowers mostly clustered in upper leaf axils.

Description
The five stamens and the style extend slightly beyond the end of the petal tube.

Taxonomy and naming
Epacris cerasicollina was first formally described in 1995 by R.K.Crowden in the journal Muelleria from specimens collected near the Swan River in 1987. The specific epithet (cerasicollina) means "cherry hill", referring to Cherry Tree Hill, where there is a large population of this species.

Distribution and habitat

References

cerasicollina
Ericales of Australia
Flora of Tasmania
Plants described in 2007
Endemic flora of Australia